Dallas Township may refer to:

Dallas Township, Huntington County, Indiana
Dallas Township, Dallas County, Iowa
Dallas Township, Marion County, Iowa, in Marion County, Iowa
Dallas Township, Taylor County, Iowa
Dallas Township, Michigan
Dallas Township, DeKalb County, Missouri
Dallas Township, Harrison County, Missouri
Dallas Township, St. Clair County, Missouri
Dallas Township, Gaston County, North Carolina
Dallas Township, Crawford County, Ohio
Dallas Township, Luzerne County, Pennsylvania

Township name disambiguation pages